Corozal North is an electoral constituency in the Corozal District represented in the House of Representatives of the National Assembly of Belize since 2012 by Hugo Amilcar Patt of the United Democratic Party.

Profile

The Corozal North constituency was created for the 1961 general election as part of a major nationwide redistricting. It is the northernmost constituency in the country, running along the Mexican border on the Hondo River. Settlements in the constituency include Paraíso, Patchacan and a portion of Corozal Town.

Area Representatives

Elections

References

British Honduras Legislative Assembly constituencies established in 1961
Political divisions in Belize
Corozal North
1961 establishments in British Honduras
Corozal District